Arixeniidae is a family of earwigs in the suborder Neodermaptera. Arixeniidae was formerly considered a suborder, Arixeniina, but was reduced in rank to family and included in the new suborder Neodermaptera.

Arixeniidae is represented by two genera, Arixenia and Xeniaria, with a total of five species. Arixenia esau and Xeniaria jacobsoni are the most well-known. As with Hemimerina, they are blind, wingless ectoparasites with filiform segmented cerci.  They are ectoparasites of various Southeast Asian bats, particularly of the genus Cheiromeles (i.e., "naked bulldog bats").

Genera
The family includes the following genera:
 Arixenia Jordan, 1909
 Xeniaria Maa, 1974

References

External links 

 An example specimen of the species Arixenia esau from the Tree of Life (note that the species is incorrectly labeled)
 An example of a female Arixenia esau from the Australian National Insect Collection 

Dermaptera families
Arixeniina